The 10 meter air pistol is an Olympic shooting event governed by the International Shooting Sport Federation (ISSF). It is similar to 10 meter air rifle in that it is shot with 4.5 mm (or .177) caliber air guns at a distance of 10 metres (11 yards), and that the match consists of a qualification round of 60 competition shots within 75 minutes. If an Electronic Scoring System (EST) is not available, 15 minutes are added to the time limit. Competitors are allowed to shoot an unlimited amount of shots during the 15 minutes preparation and sighting time. Along with the 50 meter pistol, it is considered a precision shooting event. Thus, numerous shooters compete in both events.

There are some restrictions on the pistol regarding its dimensions, weight and trigger pull weight. It must be operated by one hand only from a standing, unsupported position. The shooter decides his or her own tempo as long as the maximum time is not exceeded.

After the qualification round, the shooters with the top eight scores move on to a final round consisting of 24 competition shots. After the tenth shot, individual commands are given so that the audience may follow the progress of the standings.

The major competitions are the Olympic Games every four years and the ISSF World Shooting Championships every four years. In addition, the event is included in ISSF World Cups and in continental championships, as well as in many other international and national competitions. It is an indoor sport and, at the highest level, electronic targets are used instead of the traditional paper targets.

Range and target 
 The distance from floor level to the centre of the target is 1400mm +/- 50mm.
The air pistol range is the same as the air rifle range, giving each shooter a table, a 1 meter wide firing point, and a 10-meter distance between the firing line and the target line. The current rules require ranges to be built indoors, with specified minimum requirements for artificial lighting. Many of the top-level competitions are held at temporary ranges installed in versatile sporting facilities or convention centers.

The target, 17 by 17 cm (6.7 by 6.7 in), is traditionally made of light-coloured cardboard upon which scoring lines, and a black aiming mark consisting of the score zones 7 through 10, are printed. There is also an inner ten ring, but the amount of inner tens is only used for tie-breaking. The changing of these traditional targets is handled by each shooter, by means of electronic – or more archaically, manually operated – carrier devices. In major competitions, only one shot may be fired on each target, a number that can increase to two, five or even ten with lowering level and importance of the competition. Used targets are collected by range officials to be scored in a separate office.

During the last few decades, these paper targets have been gradually replaced by electronic target systems, immediately displaying the results on monitors. When using these systems, actual scoring lines are not printed, but the location of the impact hole (which can be determined acoustically) is automatically converted into corresponding scores by a computer. ISSF rules now require the use of these systems in top-level competitions. They are generally used in other international competitions as well, and in some countries they are even common in national competitions.

Equipment 
To promote comfortable and accurate shooting from a standing position match air pistols must have fast lock times, shoot practically recoilless and vibration-free and exhibit minimal movement and balance shifts during discharge. The pistol must also be able to be tailored by adjustable user interfaces and various accessories to individual shooters personal preferences. Combined with appropriate match pellets the pistol has to produce a consistent 10 ring performance, so a non maximal result during the initial phase can be attributed to the participant.

The pistols used are gas-driven with a caliber of 4.5 mm (.177 in). The minimum trigger pull weight is 500 gram (17.6 oz), half that of a sport pistol, and the grip restrictions are similar to sport pistols, but the box in which an air pistol must fit is larger: 42 by 20 by 5 cm (17 by 8 by 2 in). This allows for longer sight lines and also gives room for cocking arms, although with a few exceptions (such as the Baikal IZH-46M) modern match air pistols use pre-filled air, or less commonly carbon dioxide, containers. The pistol must be operated by only one hand from a standing position, and may only be loaded with one pellet at a time.

For the 10 metre air pistol and air rifle disciplines match diabolo pellets are used. These pellets have wadcutter heads, meaning the front is (nearly) flat, that leave clean round holes in paper targets for easy scoring. Match pellets are offered in tins and more elaborate packagings that avoid deformation and other damage that could impair their uniformity.
Air gunners are encouraged to perform shooting group tests with their gun clamped in a machine rest to establish which particular match pellet type performs best for their particular air gun. To facilitate maximum performance out of various air guns the leading match pellet manufacturers produce pellets with graduated "head sizes", which means the pellets are offered with front diameters from 4.48 mm up to 4.51 mm.

As in other ISSF pistol events, clothing that restricts the movement of joints for support is not allowed. Optical aids such as iris diaphragms or prescription glasses are allowed as long as they are not mounted on the pistol, which may only have open sights. Though shooting glasses are extremely customizable, most pairs contain three basic elements: a lens, a mechanical iris, and a blinder. These components work together to help shooters focus on both the faraway target and their gun's sights at the same time.
Ear protection is recommended by the ISSF as well as by coaches, who sometimes stress their usefulness in shutting out distracting noise rather than their necessity for safety reasons (paramount in other shooting disciplines).

It is each shooter's responsibility to get the pistol and shoes validated in a specific area, the equipment control, prior to starting the competition. To discourage shooters from lowering the trigger pull weight after passing the equipment control, random controls are conducted after the match. Failure to pass such controls results in immediate disqualification.

Match air pistols in production 

The following air pistols are in production :
 Baikal IZH-46M *available in the USA under Air Venturi Import, model AV-46M.
 Benelli Kite and Benelli Kite Young
 FAS 6004
 Feinwerkbau P8X and Feinwerkbau P11
 Hämmerli AP20
 Match Guns MGH1, MGH1- Light and Match Guns MGH1- Hybrid
 Morini CM 162 EI, Morini CM 162 MI, Morin I 162 EI- Titanium, and Morini 200 EI
 Pardini K10 & K12 and Pardini K10 & K12 Junior
 Steyr Evo 10, Steyr Evo 10E, Steyr LP 2 and Steyr LP 50
 Tesro PA 10-2
 Walther LP500
 Walther LP400
 Precihole PX50

Course of fire 
Shooters are generally divided into four classes: men, junior men, women and junior women. The junior classes are included in most championships, with some notable exceptions (such as the Olympic Games and the ISSF World Cups). A shooter remains a junior up to and including the calendar year in which he or she becomes 21 years of age, although a junior may opt to participate in the main class instead. There are also ISSF Junior World Cups.

In both the qualification stage and the final stage, all shooting is supervised by a Chief Range Officer, whose duties include responsibility for the correct behaviour of all personnel, dealing with technical irregularities, and cooperation with the jury.

Qualification 
For the qualification stage, the shooters are divided as necessary into relays. Each relay starts with a 15-minute preparation time during which the shooter may fire an unlimited number of sighting shots.  Afterwards, the Chief Range Officer gives the command "match firing, start", indicating the start of the competition time. 60 competition shots must be shot within a 75-minute period time (90 minutes if no electronic targets are available). The 60 shots are usually organized in 6 ten-shot series for display on scoreboards.

Final 

The top eight shooters in the qualification round advance to the final. Often, many shooters have the same score. The higher number of inner tens is the first tiebreaker. If two or more shooters have the same amount of inner tens, the shooter with the highest score in the last ten-shot series is placed higher.

During the final, the score zones are divided into tenths (by means of a special gauge, in the absence of automatic scoring devices), so that each hit can give up to 10.9 points instead of the maximum 10 during the qualification. Electronic targets are required by the ISSF for finals at the Olympic Games, ISSF World Cups and ISSF World Championships.

After a five-minute sighting shot period and the presentation of the athletes to the audience, the athletes have 250 seconds to shoot five shots after the command "for the first competition series, load, start". The same command is given again for a second five shot series. After the tenth shot, separate commands are given for each competition shot with a time limit of 50 seconds per shot. After each two shots, the athlete with the lowest score is eliminated until two shooters are left to compete for the first place in the 23rd and 24th shot.

Current rules were introduced in 2017 after the 2016 Summer Olympics.

History 

The air pistol event was introduced on the World Championship level in 1970, and on the Olympic programme in 1988. Before 1985, when finals began to be used, championships were decided by the results of the 40 or 60 shot match (40 for women and 60 for men). Before 1982, the men's match also consisted of 40 shots.

As in many other ISSF events, the target for air pistol was reduced in size in 1989, also lowering the scores (although not by much), and thereby resetting all records. The development after this shows a contrast to that of air rifle shooting: whereas in air rifle the winning score of the 1989 World Championships would not have reached the final 17 years later, the same result increase has not occurred in air pistol. Sergei Pyzhianov's world record of 593 points, set in the first World Cup Final with the new targets, remained unbeaten for almost 20 years until Jin Jong-oh set a new one with 594 points in at the ISSF World Cup Changwon 2009.

Although competitions are no longer held outdoors, the most important competitions (Olympics, World Championships, World Cups) are still scheduled for the Northern Hemisphere summer season because they are combined with outdoor events such as 50m rifle and 25m pistol events. Many lesser international events, however, are held during the European indoor season between October and March, culminating in the European Championships each year. Most of these competitions are multi-day events held together with air rifle matches.

World Championships, Men

World Championships, Men Team

World Championships, Women

World Championships, Women Team

World Championships, Mixed Team

World Championships, total medals

Current world records

Olympic and World Champions 
The ISSF publishes lists of historical champions.

Men 

A green background indicates the Olympic champion.

Women 

A green background indicates the Olympic champion.

References 

ISSF shooting events
Handgun shooting sports
Pneumatic weapons